The 2013 Intercity Football League (known as the MediaTek Intercity Football League for sponsorship reasons) was the seventh season of the Intercity Football League since its establishment in 2007. The season began on 11 May 2013 and will end on 16 November 2013. Taiwan Power Company were the defending champions, having won the league for the 4th time last season.

Clubs
A total of 8 clubs will contest the league, including five sides from the 2012 season and three new clubs.

Stadia and locations 
Note: Table lists in alphabetical order.

Standings

Results

References

External links
Chinese Taipei Football Association
FIFA.com standings
Soccerway: Inter City League 2013

Top level Taiwanese football league seasons
Intercity Football League seasons
Taipei
Taipei
1